Muriel Hermine (born 3 September 1963) is a synchronized swimmer from France.

References 

1963 births
Living people
French synchronized swimmers
Olympic synchronized swimmers of France
Synchronized swimmers at the 1984 Summer Olympics
Synchronized swimmers at the 1988 Summer Olympics
World Aquatics Championships medalists in synchronised swimming
Synchronized swimmers at the 1986 World Aquatics Championships
Synchronized swimmers at the 1982 World Aquatics Championships
Sportspeople from Le Mans